Yangnam-myeon is a myeon or a township in the administrative subdivisions of the Gyeongju City, North Gyeongsang province, South Korea. It is bordered by the Sea of Japan (East Sea) on the east, the Ulju County of Ulsan Metropolitan City on the south, Oedong-eup on the west and Yangbuk-myeon on the north. Its 85.06 square kilometers are home to about 7,131 people. The Wolseong Nuclear Power Plant is situated in the myeon.

Administrative divisions
Gigu-ri (기구리)
Nasan-ri (나산리)
Naa-ri (나아리)
Sanggye-ri (상계리)
Sangna-ri (상라리)
Seodong-ri (서동리)
Seogeup-ri (석읍리)
Seokchon-ri (석촌리)
Suryeom-ri (수렴리)
Sindae-ri (신대리)
Sinseo-ri (신서리)
Eupcheon-ri (읍천리)
Haseo-ri (하서리)
Hwanseo-ri (환서리)
Hyodong-ri (효동리)

See also
Subdivisions of Gyeongju
Administrative divisions of South Korea

References

External links
 The official site of the Yangnam-myeon office 

Subdivisions of Gyeongju
Towns and townships in North Gyeongsang Province